Tuğlu can refer to:

 Tuğlu, Çivril
 Tuğlu, Kahta
 Tuğlu, Kemaliye
 Tuğlu, Sungurlu